The ABU TV Song Festival 2013 was the second annual edition of the ABU TV Song Festivals. The festival, which is non-competitive, that took place on 26 October 2013 in the Hanoi Opera House, Hanoi, Vietnam and coinciding with the 50th general assembly of the Asia-Pacific Broadcasting Union (ABU) which took place between 23 and 29 October 2013. Sixteen songs from fifteen countries participated in the second edition of the event.

Location 

Hanoi is the capital of Vietnam and the country's second largest city. Its population in 2009 was estimated at 2.6 million for urban districts, 6.5 million for the metropolitan jurisdiction. From 1010 until 1802, it was the most important political centre of Vietnam. It was eclipsed by Huế, the imperial capital of Vietnam during the Nguyen dynasty (1802-1945), but Hanoi served as the capital of French Indochina from 1902 to 1954. From 1954 to 1976, it was the capital of North Việt Nam, and it became the capital of a reunified Vietnam in 1976, after the North's victory in the Vietnam War.

The city is located on the right bank of the Red River.

Initially, Vietnam Cultural Friendship Hall was chosen as the festival's venue. The venue was later changed to Hanoi Opera House, which was smaller in terms of capacity (nearly 600 seats in comparison to 1100 seats of the former)

National host broadcaster
Vietnam Television will be the host broadcaster for the second edition of the annual Song Festival.  The venue for the 2013 TV Song Festival is the Hanoi Opera House in central Hanoi, Vietnam.

Format 
Unlike the format used in the Eurovision Song Contest there are two versions of the ABU Song Festivals.  The ABU Radio Song Festival which is a biennial competitive event and the ABU TV Song Festival which is an annual non-competitive event.  The TV Song Festival is scheduled to take place on 26 October 2013, in conjunction with the 50th ABU General Assembly which takes place between 23 and 29 October 2013. During the TV Festival, musicians from participating countries will perform a song from their repertoire in a musical gala presentation.

Participating countries 

A total of fifteen countries took part in the 2013 ABU TV Song Festival.

International broadcasts 
Each participating country was invited to broadcast the event across their respective networks and provide commentary in the native languages to add insight and description to the shows.

  – Radio Television Afghanistan (RTA)
  – SBS Two (9 November 2013) 
  – Radio Televisyen Brunei (RTB)
  – China Central Television (CCTV)
  – Television Broadcasts Limited (TVB)
  – Televisi Republik Indonesia (23 November 2013)
  – Islamic Republic of Iran Broadcasting (IRIB)
  – Japan Broadcasting Corporation (NHK)
  – Kyrgyz Television (KTRK)
  – Radio Televisyen Malaysia (RTM) (26 December 2013)
  – MediaCorp Suria
  – Korean Broadcasting System (KBS)
  – MTV Channel (MTV)
  – National Broadcasting Services of Thailand (NBT)
  (host) – VTV (26 October 2013; live)

See also 
 ABU Song Festivals
 Asia-Pacific Broadcasting Union
 Eurovision Song Contest
 Eurovision Song Contest 2013
 Junior Eurovision Song Contest 2013
 Turkvision Song Contest 2013

References

External links 
 Official website
 ABU TV Song Festival at ESCKAZ

ABU Song Festivals
2013 in Vietnam
21st century in Hanoi
2013 song contests
Music festivals in Vietnam